Leptorhynchoides is a genus of parasitic worms belonging to the family Rhadinorhynchidae.

The species of this genus are found in Europe and Northern America.

Species:

Leptorhynchoides acanthidion 
Leptorhynchoides aphredoderi 
Leptorhynchoides apoglyphicus 
Leptorhynchoides atlanteus 
Leptorhynchoides macrorchis 
Leptorhynchoides nebularosis 
Leptorhynchoides plagicephalus 
Leptorhynchoides polycristatus 
Leptorhynchoides seminolus 
Leptorhynchoides thecatus

References

Rhadinorhynchidae
Acanthocephala families